The 2011–12 Andebol 1 was the 60th season of Portuguese premier handball league. It ran from 10 September 2011 to 19 May 2012.   Porto won their seventeenth title and the fourth consecutive season.

Teams

The 12 teams contesting the 2010-11 Andebol 1 season were:

League table

First group

Second round

Group A – champion

Group B – relegation

Top three goalscorers

References

Handball in Portugal
2011–12 domestic handball leagues
2011 in Portuguese sport
2012 in Portuguese sport